Law of the Northwest is a 1943 American Western film directed by William Berke and starring Charles Starrett, Shirley Patterson and Arthur Hunnicutt.

Cast
 Charles Starrett as Steve King 
 Shirley Patterson as Michele Darcy 
 Arthur Hunnicutt as Arkansas 
 Stanley Brown as Neal Clayton 
 Davison Clark as Tom Clayton 
 Johnny Mitchell as Paul Darcy 
 Donald Curtis as Frank Mason 
 Douglas Leavitt as George Bradley 
 Reginald Barlow as Jean Darcy 
 John Tyrrell as Spokesman 
 John Shay as Mayo 
 Ed Cassidy as Biddle 
 Eddie Laughton as Patton 
 Al Boles as Henchman 
 Chuck Baldra as Henchman

References

Bibliography
 Pitts, Michael R. Western Movies: A Guide to 5,105 Feature Films. McFarland, 2012.

External links
 

1943 films
1943 Western (genre) films
1940s English-language films
American Western (genre) films
Columbia Pictures films
Films directed by William A. Berke
American black-and-white films
Royal Canadian Mounted Police in fiction
Northern (genre) films
1940s American films